Hellinsia praenigratus is a moth of the family Pterophoridae that is found in Peru and Ecuador.

The wingspan is 15‑20 mm. The forewings are brown‑ochreous and the markings are dark brown. The hindwings and fringes are brown grey. Adults are on wing in January, from March to May, in October and December.

References

praenigratus
Moths described in 1921
Moths of South America